Universitetsplassen (University Square) is a square in the city center of Oslo, Norway. The square borders the street Karl Johans gate, and is surrounded by three buildings of the Faculty of Law, University of Oslo.

Squares in Oslo
University of Oslo